Pitt most commonly refers to:

The University of Pittsburgh, commonly known as Pitt, a university located in Pittsburgh, Pennsylvania, United States
Pitt Panthers, the athletic teams of the University of Pittsburgh
Pitt (surname), a surname of English origin, particularly associated with two British Prime Ministers:
William Pitt, 1st Earl of Chatham (William Pitt the Elder) (1708–1778), Prime Minister of Great Britain (1766–1768)
William Pitt the Younger (1759–1806), son of the above and Prime Minister of Great Britain (1783–1801) and of the United Kingdom (1801 and 1804–1806)

Education
Pittsburg State University ("Pitt State"), located in Pittsburg, Kansas, United States

Geography
Pitt County, North Carolina, a county in the United States
Pitt, Hampshire, a hamlet in Hursley parish, Hampshire, England
Pitt Island, an island in the Chatham Archipelago, New Zealand
Pitt River (Canada), a river in British Columbia, Canada
Pitt River (New Zealand), a river in Fiordland, New Zealand
The River Pitt, a river in Somerset, England
Pit River, a river in California, United States, which is sometimes referred to as "Pitt River"

Fiction
Pitt (character), a comic book character published by Full Bleed Studios
The Pitt, a single issue comic book published in 1987 by Marvel Comics
Fallout 3: The Pitt, the second downloadable content pack for Fallout 3
Dirk Pitt, the protagonist of a series of bestselling adventure novels written by Clive Cussler
Justin Pitt, a minor character in the television series Seinfeld

Other uses
, a number of British warships of that name
Fort Pitt, a number of military forts of that name

See also

Pitts (disambiguation)